Brisco County, Jr. is a fictional character played by Bruce Campbell in the American science fiction / western television series The Adventures of Brisco County, Jr., which aired for a single season on the Fox Network in 1993 and 1994.

Background 
The character of Brisco County, Jr. exists in a fictional Old West of 1893. It is partly a traditional Hollywood depiction of the frontier, with settlers, gunfighters, outlaws, and cowboys. In the world of Brisco County, Jr., however, there is also steampunk technology, such as zeppelins and rockets, and Weird West elements, such as time travel and supernatural powers. Robber barons direct the financial and industrial workings of this west from the boardrooms of the Westerfield Club in San Francisco, California. An outlaw named John Bly is disrupting the industrialists' businesses and they are desperate to capture Bly and his gang. Bly himself is intently searching for a supernatural object called The Orb, a bronze-colored device unearthed in a California mine. It is into this setting that Brisco County, Jr., a Harvard-educated lawyer-turned-bounty hunter, enters the search for John Bly.

Arc 

When the story of the television show begins, famous U.S. Marshal Brisco County, Sr., has captured notorious outlaw John Bly and his gang. Bly and his gang manage to escape, murdering Brisco County, Sr. in the process. His son is Brisco County, Jr., who vows to avenge his father's death and bring John Bly to justice. Brisco is hired by the robber barons of the Westerfield Club to track and capture Bly and his gang. Brisco is assigned a liaison to the industrialists, a lawyer named Socrates Poole. Socrates relays financial support and information to Brisco, and the two men often work together. A rival bounty hunter, Lord Bowler, tries to beat Brisco to the Bly gang. Although the two bounty hunters begin their relationship as archrivals, they often find themselves helping each other, and as the series develops, they become partners.

While tracking John Bly's second-in-command, Big Smith, Brisco stumbles on to the existence of the Orb, and the powers that it possesses. Brisco learns that one of the robber barons who hired him is also in league with John Bly to acquire the Orb. Several times throughout the series, Brisco encounters the Orb. In one encounter, Bly mortally wounds Brisco with a gunshot, but Brisco uses the Orb's power to heal himself. At another encounter, Brisco uses the Orb to travel through time and save the life of Bowler. When Brisco finally defeats Bly midway through the series, the Orb is recovered by a time traveler from the future.

Throughout his travels and missions, Brisco frequently meets with Dixie Cousins, a saloon singer who was once romantically involved with two members of John Bly's gang. Brisco and Dixie begin a brief romantic encounter in the pilot episode, but subsequent episodes deepen their relationship. Dixie's life is endangered occasionally when her plans intersect with Brisco's missions, and Brisco often saves her from trouble. Later in the series, Brisco and Dixie fall in love, but their lifestyles continue to keep them apart.

Concept and creation

The character of Brisco County, Jr. was conceived by Boam and Cuse when they were approached by Fox to create a television show. Cuse had the idea to combine the science fiction and westerns genres. He invented the character of Brisco, who would be on a mission to track down the outlaws who murdered his father. Brisco was originally conceived to be a womanizing character, with a different girl in every episode. The producers later decided to make him a "one-woman man", due to Kelly Rutherford's well-received performance as Dixie. Cuse and Boam wanted Brisco to be a hero who could think his way out of tough situations, rather than resorting to violence. Brisco has a gun, but rarely uses it, and never to kill. Cuse said, "he'll shoot a sign and have it crash down on somebody's head. He just finds a clever way out of a jam."

Reception 
Writing in Variety, Todd Everett compared Brisco to Indiana Jones, saying that Brisco is also a "university-educated adventurer, only more skilled and less humble. Dashing in his own way but a bit bland, Campbell is no Harrison Ford."
 Mark Schwed and Todd Holland praised The Adventures of Brisco County, Jr. in TV Guide, calling Brisco "an Ivy League cowboy hero" who is "smart, hunky, and funny...a hero for the '90s – an old-fashioned Lone Ranger type with contemporary wit."

References 

Fictional Harvard University people
Fictional characters from San Francisco
Fictional gunfighters
Science fiction television characters
Steampunk
Television characters introduced in 1993
Western (genre) bounty hunters